Lippi is an Italian surname. Notable people with the surname include:

Annibale Lippi (16th century, d. after 18 November 1581), architect, son of Nanni di Baccio Bigio
Antonio Lippi (1900–1957) Italian high speed aviator 
Claudio Lippi (born 1945), Italian television presenter, actor and singer
Claudio Lippi (journalist) (1970–2013), Italian journalist
Filippino Lippi (1457–1504), Italian painter, son of Filippo
Filippo Lippi (c.1406–1469), Italian painter
Giovanni Lippi (c.1507–1768), architect, best known as Nanni di Baccio Bigio
Lorenzo Lippi (1606–1665), Italian painter and poet
Marcello Lippi (born 1948), Italian football manager
Roberto Lippi (1926–2011), Italian racing driver
Rosina Lippi (born 1956), American writer

See also
Fra Lippo Lippi, an 1855 dramatic monologue written by the Victorian poet Robert Browning

Italian-language surnames